Just Know That I Love You, known as  in Japan,  is an album by American recording artist and musician Priscilla Ahn. The album was inspired by the Joan G. Robinson novel When Marnie Was There and written for the anime film adaptation of the novel, released by Studio Ghibli in 2014.

Release
The album was released on CD in Japan, and in 113 countries worldwide (including Japan) as a digital download on the iTunes Store on 16 July 2014. It reached #58 on the Oricon charts during the week of 28 July 2014 and remained on them for 10 weeks.

Track listing

References

External links
 

2014 albums
Priscilla Ahn albums